Dragan Trajković may refer to:
Dragan Trajković (footballer, born 1986), Serbian association football player
Dragan Trajković (footballer, born 1997), Serbian association football player for FK Radnički 1923